is a female Japanese pop singer. She debuted with the single, I LIKE THE WAY, composed by BULGE, which reached 28 on the weekly Oricon. Her newest single, Tori no Uta / PLACE contains the opening and ending themes for the hit Japanese anime series, Jūsō Kikō Dancouga Nova, where Tori no Uta is the opening theme, while PLACE is the ending theme.

Discography

Mini Album

[2006.04.12] Never Gonna Let You Go 
 1・NEVER GONNA LET YOU GO
 2・FLY AWAY
 3・LOVE YOUR ALL
 4・cookie
 5・I LIKE THE WAY -Album Mix-
 6・光
 7・恋 -Album Mix-
 8・Tears

First press DVD bonus 
 1・I LIKE THE WAY -Album Mix- Promotion Video
 2・NEVER GONNA LET YOU GO Promotion Video

Singles

[2005.08.17] I Like The Way / 恋 
 1･LIKE THE WAY : ＜OUT☆PUT＞ エンディングテーマ
 2･恋 : 株式会社 飯田産業CMソング

[2007.04.11] 鳥の歌 / Place 
 1・鳥の歌
     <獣装機攻 ダンクーガ ノヴァ> オープニング曲
 2・PLACE
     <獣装機攻 ダンクーガ ノヴァ> エンディング曲
 3・SCENE -by your side-
 4・鳥の歌(カラオケ)
 5・PLACE(カラオケ)

External links 
 Official Website 
 Personal Journal 

Living people
1979 births
Musicians from Fukuoka Prefecture
21st-century Japanese singers
21st-century Japanese women singers